Waltham is an inner suburb of Christchurch, New Zealand, located approximately two kilometres south-east of the city centre.  State Highway 76, part of Christchurch's ring road system, and known there as Brougham Street, runs through the suburb, as does the Lyttelton Line rail corridor.

Approximate boundaries of the suburb are Waltham Road, Moorhouse Avenue, Ferry Road, Ensors Road, and the Heathcote River. Waltham was originally part of the Sydenham borough and was incorporated into the City of Christchurch in 1903 when the borough was ended. In the early 1980s local residents and the Christchurch city council tried to name the western part of the suburb, Charleston, between Ferry Road and Ensors Road. This was done to maintain the residential nature of the area against perceived industrial expansion.  The attempt was partly successful and that area today is referred to as both Waltham and Charleston.

The full suburb is a mixture of residential and both light and heavy industry.

History 
An early Christchurch settler, Charles Prince, owned a large house, called Waltham House, on nearby Colombo St South. In 1866 a meeting of local residents was held at the house and it unanimously agreed to name the district of the present day suburb, Waltham.

The Christchurch gasworks was located at the inner boundary of Waltham until its closure around 1980.

Waltham was home to a malt works and a collection of warehouses on Waltham road. These were demolished and redeveloped into 88 two and three bedroom townhouses after the 2011 Christchurch earthquakes.

Demographics
Waltham comprises three statistical areas. Waltham and Charleston are primarily residential. Lancaster Park is an L-shaped area which extends north on the western side of Nursery Street to Cashel Street.

Residential areas
The residential areas cover .

Waltham, comprising the statistical areas of Waltham and Charleston (Christchurch City), had a population of 3,339 at the 2018 New Zealand census, an increase of 327 people (10.9%) since the 2013 census, and an increase of 417 people (14.3%) since the 2006 census. There were 1,461 households. There were 1,725 males and 1,614 females, giving a sex ratio of 1.07 males per female, with 474 people (14.2%) aged under 15 years, 996 (29.8%) aged 15 to 29, 1,560 (46.7%) aged 30 to 64, and 306 (9.2%) aged 65 or older.

Ethnicities were 69.6% European/Pākehā, 13.7% Māori, 6.5% Pacific peoples, 18.3% Asian, and 4.2% other ethnicities (totals add to more than 100% since people could identify with multiple ethnicities).

The proportion of people born overseas was 31.9%, compared with 27.1% nationally.

Although some people objected to giving their religion, 50.1% had no religion, 31.4% were Christian, 4.2% were Hindu, 0.9% were Muslim, 1.0% were Buddhist and 5.5% had other religions.

Of those at least 15 years old, 636 (22.2%) people had a bachelor or higher degree, and 531 (18.5%) people had no formal qualifications. The employment status of those at least 15 was that 1,611 (56.2%) people were employed full-time, 372 (13.0%) were part-time, and 153 (5.3%) were unemployed.

Lancaster Park

Lancaster Park had a population of 243 at the 2018 New Zealand census, an increase of 24 people (11.0%) since the 2013 census, and a decrease of 15 people (-5.8%) since the 2006 census. There were 72 households. There were 153 males and 87 females, giving a sex ratio of 1.76 males per female. The median age was 34.7 years (compared with 37.4 years nationally), with 24 people (9.9%) aged under 15 years, 66 (27.2%) aged 15 to 29, 141 (58.0%) aged 30 to 64, and 12 (4.9%) aged 65 or older.

Ethnicities were 54.3% European/Pākehā, 12.3% Māori, 7.4% Pacific peoples, 30.9% Asian, and 3.7% other ethnicities (totals add to more than 100% since people could identify with multiple ethnicities).

The proportion of people born overseas was 44.4%, compared with 27.1% nationally.

Although some people objected to giving their religion, 48.1% had no religion, 34.6% were Christian, 3.7% were Hindu, 1.2% were Muslim, 1.2% were Buddhist and 3.7% had other religions.

Of those at least 15 years old, 30 (13.7%) people had a bachelor or higher degree, and 33 (15.1%) people had no formal qualifications. The median income was $24,200, compared with $31,800 nationally. The employment status of those at least 15 was that 120 (54.8%) people were employed full-time, 27 (12.3%) were part-time, and 18 (8.2%) were unemployed.

Waltham summer pool 
The Waltham swimming pools were badly damaged in the 2011 Christchurch earthquakes. The pools were reopened in January 2015 after repair work that was estimated to cost $3.2 million dollars. Repair work included upgraded signage, a re-sized plant room, fencing, painting, landscaping and roofing,

The outdoor pools are open over summer each year. The complex includes a nine lane 33 metre swimming pool, a toddler pool and a waterslide.

Education
Waltham School is a full primary school for years 1 to 8, with a roll of  students. The school opened in 1891.

Te Kura Kaupapa Māori o Waitaha is a composite school for years 1 to 13, teaching in the Māori language. It has a roll of  students. The school was established in 1987.

Both of these are coeducational state schools. Rolls are as of

References 

 

Suburbs of Christchurch